Felicity Milovanovich (born 5 July 1992) is a New Zealand actress, DJ and music producer. She is best known for her role as Jen in The Killian Curse, Zora in The New Tomorrow and Carmen in Time Trackers. She currently DJs in New Zealand under the name Misfits of Zion.

Credits

Short film
Shelley (2007) as Shelley

Television
The New Tomorrow (2005) as Zora
The Killian Curse (2006–2008) as Jen
Time Trackers (2008) as Carmen

Theatre
The Lovely Bones previs work (2007) as Lindsey
The Crucible (2007) as Betty
Titus Andronicus (2009) as Young Lucius

Training
Theatre Long Cloud Youth Theatre, Willem Wassenaar (2008–2010)
American Accent Course at Actors Centre Australia, Jamie Irvine (2011)

References

External links
Resume Page and agent

1992 births
Living people
New Zealand actresses